Senator Sturtevant may refer to:

Ephraim Sturtevant (1803–1881), Florida State Senate
Glen Sturtevant (born 1982), Virginia State Senate